Friends is an American television sitcom.

Friends or The Friends may also refer to:
 Friendship, an interpersonal relationship between humans
 Quakers, or members of the Religious Society of Friends

Film
 Friends (1912 film), an American film by D. W. Griffith
 Friends (1938 film), a Soviet film by Lev Arnshtam
 Friends (1971 film), a British film with a soundtrack by Elton John and Bernie Taupin
 The Friends (film), a 1971 French film by Gérard Blain
 Friends (1988 film), a Japanese-Swedish film
 Friends (1993 film), a South African film starring Kerry Fox
 Friends (1999 film), an Indian Malayalam film starring Jayaram and Mukesh
 Friends (2001 film), an Indian Tamil film starring Vijay and Suriya
 Friends (With Benefits), a 2009 comedy-drama film

Literature
 The Friends (play), a 1970 play by Arnold Wesker
 Friends: A Love Story, a 2007 nonfiction book by Angela Bassett and Courtney B. Vance with Hilary Beard
 The Friends (novel), a 1973 novel by Rosa Guy

Music

Bands
 Friends (Swedish band), a sextet who represented Sweden at the Eurovision Song Contest 2001
 Friends (American band), a band from Brooklyn
 Friends, an American-Australian soft rock trio that was the predecessor to Cotton, Lloyd and Christian
 Friends, a 1980s Dutch band featuring Carola Smit
 Friends, alternative name for Leo de Castro and Friends, a 1970s Australian rock band

Albums
 Friends (film soundtrack), a 1971 soundtrack by Elton John and Bernie Taupin
 Friends (B'z album) (1992)
 Friends (The Beach Boys album) (1968)
 Friends (Chick Corea album) (1978)
 Friends (Easybeats album) (1969)
 Friends (B.B. King album) (1974)
 Friends (Erina Mano album) (2009)
 Friends (Hugh Masekela and Larry Willis album) (2005)
 Friends (Anthony Neely album) (2013)
 Sakura Gakuin 2011 Nendo: Friends, a 2012 album by Sakura Gakuin
 Friends (Shalamar album) (1982)
 Friends (Sly and Robbie album) (1998)
 Friends (Dionne Warwick album) (1985)
 Friends (White Lies album) (2016)
 Friends (Omar Apollo EP), 2019
 The Friends EP, a 2007 EP by Ween
 Friends, a 1981 album by BZN
 Friends, a 1983 album by Larry Carlton
 Friends, a 2004 album by Mocca
 Friends, a 1998 EP by Testeagles

Songs
 "Friends" (Beach Boys song), 1968
"Friends" (Terry Reid song), 1969
 "Friends" (Elton John song), 1971
 "Friends" (Bette Midler song), 1973
 "Friends" (Razzy Bailey song), 1981
 "Friends" (Joe Satriani composition), 1992
 "Friends" (Stella Getz song), 1993
 "Friends" (Scooter song), 1995
 "Friends" (John Michael Montgomery song), 1996
 "Friends" (Aura Dione song), 2012
 "Friends" (Francis and the Lights song), 2016
 "Friends" (Justin Bieber and BloodPop song), 2017
 "Friends" (Marshmello and Anne-Marie song), 2018
 "Friends" (Flume song), 2019
 "Friends" (Amii Stewart song), 1984
 "Friends" (Jody Watley song), 1989
 "Friends" (Whodini song), 1984
 Friends (Monica song), 2022
 "Friends!", a song by Nami Tamaki, 2009
 "Friends", by Adam & The Ants, from the EP The B-Sides, 1982
 "Friends", by Backyard Babies, from the album Stockholm Syndrome, 2003
 "Friends", by Pat Boone, from the album Departure, 1969
 "Friends", by BTS, from the album Map of the Soul: 7, 2020
 "Friends", by The Carters, from the album Everything Is Love, 2018
 "Friends", by Dido, from the album Still on My Mind, 2019
 "Friends", by Faster Pussycat, from the album Whipped!, 1992
 "Friends", by Gentle Giant, from the album Giant for a Day!, 1978
 "Friends", by Hustle Gang, from the album We Want Smoke, 2017
 "Friends", by J. Cole, from the album KOD, 2018
 "Friends", by Led Zeppelin, from the album Led Zeppelin III, 1970
 "Friends", by Barry Manilow, from the album Barry Manilow, 1973
 "Friends", by The Police, from the single "Don't Stand So Close to Me", 1980
 "Friends", by Raven-Symoné, from the album That's So Raven Too!, 2006
 "Friends", by Sakura Gakuin, from the album Sakura Gakuin 2011 Nendo: Friends, 2012
 "Friends", by Blake Shelton from If I'm Honest, 2016
 "Friends", by Michael W. Smith, from the album Michael W. Smith Project, 1983
 "Friends", by Meghan Trainor, from the album Thank You, 2016
 "Friends", by Tubeway Army, from the album Tubeway Army, 1978
 "Friends", by Ween, from the album La Cucaracha, 2007
 "Friends", by Why Don't We, from the album 8 Letters, 2018
 "Friends", by Whodini, from the album Escape, 1984
 "Friends", by Hyper Potions, main theme of the video game Sonic Mania, 2017

Television
 Friends (1979 TV series), an American kids-oriented drama
 Friends (2002 TV series), a South Korean-Japanese drama
 Friends (Polish TV series) or Przyjaciółki, a 2012 Polish drama TV series
 Friends (2021 TV program), a South Korean reality show
 The Friends (TV series), a South Korean TV series

Other uses
 Friends (ship), a 1779 convict transport ship
 Friends (collage), a 2011 mixed media collage by India Cruse-Griffin
 Friends (smart speaker), a smart speaker developed by Naver Corporation and Line Corporation
 Friends Arena, an arena in Stockholm, Sweden
 Friends FM, a radio station in Kolkata, India
 Friends Hospital, a hospital in Philadelphia, Pennsylvania
 Friends University, a university in Wichita, Kansas
 Friends-International, a NGO aid foundation
 Friends, members in the Two by Twos house churches

See also
 Friend (disambiguation)
 Friendship (disambiguation)
 List of Friends schools
 My Friends (disambiguation)